Seq24 is a software MIDI music sequencer that runs under Linux and Microsoft Windows. Written in C++, it is designed to be simple to use and appropriate for live performance.

Distributed under the terms of the GPL-2.0-or-later license, Seq24 is free software.

Seq24 is intended to be similar to hardware sequencers/samplers such as Akai's MPC line of instruments. It works by sequencing smaller sequences or loops of MIDI notes and performance information into larger music sequences in a manner similar to the way in which Sony's Acid software is used to sequence audio clips. In order to do this, it has a patterns panel, a pattern editor and a song editor. Sequences are saved as Standard MIDI file format, type 1.

While developed from 2002 to 2006 by Rob Buse, a team (calling themselves simply 'Seq24team') picked up the project in 2008 with Rob's blessing, and resumed work with release 0.8.8.

See also

Free audio software

References

External links
Seq24 - Official Webpage
Seq24 Launchpad Site - The development site for Seq24
Seq24 wiki - A wiki created around new development efforts of Seq24
Seq24plus - GitHub repository for developing Seq24 further
Sequencer64 - A major reboot of Seq24, with many new features

Free music software
Linux audio video-related software
Free audio editors